Ash Wednesday is a 1931 German drama film directed by Johannes Meyer and starring Karl Ludwig Diehl, Hans Stüwe and Claire Rommer.

The film's sets were designed by the art director Willi Herrmann.

Cast

References

Bibliography

External links 
 

1931 films
1931 drama films
Films of the Weimar Republic
German drama films
1930s German-language films
Films directed by Johannes Meyer
Films set in 1913
German black-and-white films
Films set in Cologne
1930s German films